Tage Henning Ekfeldt (14 June 1926 – 28 December 2005) was a Swedish sprinter who won a bronze medal in the 4 × 400 m relay at the 1950 European Athletics Championships, together with Gösta Brännström, Rune Larsson and Lars-Erik Wolfbrandt. They failed to reach the final at the 1952 Summer Olympics, and finished fourth at the 1954 European Athletics Championships. Ekfeldt won the national titles in the 400 m (1952),  800 m (1952 and 1953) and 4 × 400 m (1952 and 1953). In 1953 he set a new national record in the 800 m.

References

1926 births
2005 deaths
Swedish male sprinters
Olympic athletes of Sweden
Athletes (track and field) at the 1952 Summer Olympics
European Athletics Championships medalists
Sportspeople from Norrköping